Article 490 of the Moroccan Penal Code criminalizes extramarital sexual relations in Morocco.

Text 
The text of the article reads as follows:

Article 490: Every sexual relation between a man and a woman not bound by wedlock is a crime of corruption punished by imprisonment from a month up to a year.

Reactions 
The "moroccan outlaws"" campaign, with the express goal of ending Article 490, began as a manifesto and petition during the trial of the Moroccan journalist Hajar Raissouni. The movement was led by the filmmaker Sonia Terrab and the writer and French Francophone affairs minister Leïla Slimani.

References 

Law in Africa
Human rights legislation
Society of Morocco